Brigid Kehoe Doyle is a former camogie player, winner of the B+I Star of the Year award and an All Ireland medal in 1968, 1969 and 1975 and a National League in 1968.

Family background
She is one of three sisters from Clonleigh who won All Ireland medals together in 1975 alongside Kit Codd and team captain Gretta Quigley. Brigid captained the '69 team. Two other sisters, Annie and Josie both played on Wexford's 1968 All Ireland winning team, and two more, seven in all, also played inter-county for Wexford.

References

Living people
Wexford camogie players
Year of birth missing (living people)